In finance, an exchange for ETF (EFETF) transaction is one in which ETF units are exchanged for futures contracts which have the same underlying index; this is usually any of the broad based equity indices in North America, Europe, and Asia for which there is a liquid future available. Typical indices are S&P, FTSE, DAX, CAC 40. It is similar to an exchange for physical (EFP) in which the constituent basket of stocks is exchanged for a futures contract.
Usually traded via a broker who will cross the futures on exchange, this is a way for ETF market makers to manage their inventories in ETF positions which they have hedged with futures

References
Futures markets
Derivatives (finance)